Geir Helgemo (born 14 February 1970) is a professional bridge player who was born in Norway but is now a citizen of Monaco. Through 2012 he had won three world championships in  competition. As of August 2018 he ranked first among Open World Grand Masters and his regular partner Tor Helness ranked second.

Helgemo was born in Vinstra, Norway. For several years through 1994 he represented Norway on both its junior and open teams. The juniors won the 1990 European Championship and both teams finished second in the 1993 World Championships. From that time Helgemo played with Tor Helness on the open team, which was always strong and won another world silver medal in 2001. Norway finally won the world team championship in 2007, the biennial Bermuda Bowl, with a team of six including Helness–Helgemo as anchor pair.

At the inaugural 2008 World Mind Sports Games in Beijing, Tor Helness won the Open Individual gold medal and Geir Helgemo won the silver. Norway's open team won the bronze.

Emigration to Monaco
From 2011 Helgemo and Helness were full-time members of a team led and funded by the Swiss real estate tycoon Pierre Zimmermann, under a contract expiring in 2016. The team, not yet playing full-time, finished third in the 2010 World Championship and subsequently competed in the European Bridge League open championship. In 2012, all six members of the team became citizens of Monaco. In 2017 Helgemo and Helness were both convicted of tax evasion."

Reporting False Scores - Suspension
Helgemo's team reported a false score (claiming a match was played when it was not to the benefit of both teams) in a match in Norway. All players involved were suspended by the Norwegian Bridge Federation. Three of the players involved, Terje Aa (ACBL # 9027661), Geir Helgemo (ACBL # 4036808) and Jørgen Molberg (ACBL # 8896631) were members of the American Contract Bridge League (ACBL) and were suspended by the ACBL.

Use of prohibited drugs
On 1 March 2019, at which time Helgemo was the world's highest-ranked player, the World Bridge Federation (WBF) announced that he had been suspended for a year after testing positive for two banned substances in a sample he had provided at the World Bridge Series in Orlando in September 2018: clomifene  and synthetic testosterone. The drugs were said to be "not performance enhancing" by Kari-Anne Opsal, the president of the Norwegian Bridge Federation. The WBF is recognised by the International Olympic Committee and therefore follows the World Anti-Doping Agency's rules on which drugs are permissible. The ban, backdated to begin when he accepted a provisional suspension, is due to expire on 20 November 2019. A spokesperson for the Monaco Bridge Federation said: "We regret that a talent such as Geir Helgemo is sanctioned under an anti-doping regulation that is certainly adapted to physical sport but totally unsuitable for brain sport."

Books

 Helgemo's World of Bridge: the maestro reveals his secrets, Geo Tislevoll and Helgemo (High Wycombe: Five Aces, 2000), 102 pp. – biography; translated from Norwegian, 
 Bridge with Imagination, David Bird and Helgemo (London: Finesse Bridge, 2000), 160 pp.,

Bridge accomplishments

Awards
Herman Trophy 1999
IBPA Award (Personality of the Year) 1996
Le Bridgeur Award (Best Played Hand of the Year) 1997
Digital Fountain Award (Best Played Hand of the Year) 2003
Romex Award (Best Bid Hand of the Year) 1999
Precision Award (Best Defended Hand of the Year) 1991
Sender Award (Best Defended Hand of the Year) 1998

Major wins

Bermuda Bowl (1) 2007
Rosenblum Cup (1) 2006
World Junior Pairs (1) 1995
World Transnational Open Teams Championship (1) 2009, 2015
North American Bridge Championships (12)
Reisinger (4) 1998, 1999, 2012, 2013
Vanderbilt (1) 2010
Spingold (2) 2011, 2012
Open Board-a-Match Teams (1) 1999
Jacoby Open Swiss Teams (2) 1997, 2005
Blue Ribbon Pairs (1) 2003
Open Pairs I (1) 1998
European Championships (3)
Open Teams (2) 2008, 2012
Junior Teams (1) 1990
Nordic Championships (3)
Open Teams (1) 2003
Junior Teams (1) 1989
School Teams (1) 1987
Norwegian Championships (34)
Open Pairs (7) 1993, 1995, 1996, 1999, 2000, 2006, 2007
Club Teams (8) 1997, 2000, 2002, 2004, 2006, 2008, 2014, 2022
Premier League (12) 1990, 1991, 1992, 1998, 2000, 2002, 2003, 2004, 2005, 2014, 2015, 2022
Swiss Pairs (1) 2022
Mixed Pairs (3) 1995, 2001, 2014
Mixed Teams (1) 2006
Junior Pairs (1) 1993

Other notable wins
Cap Volmac World Top Invitational Pairs (2) 1994, 1996
Cap Gemini Ernst & Young World Top Invitational Pairs (1) 2002
Macallan Invitational Pairs (2) 1998, 1999
Politiken World Pairs (1) 1997
Hecht Cup (1) 2006
Generali World Masters Individual (1) 1996
Cavendish Invitational Teams (1) 2010

Major runners-up
Bermuda Bowl (3) 1993, 2001, 2013
Rosenblum Cup (1) 2014
The Vanderbilt Trophy (1) 2016
World Mixed Teams (1) 2022
World Junior Teams (1) 1993
North American Bridge Championships (5)
Master Mixed Teams (1) 1998
Blue Ribbon Pairs (1) 1997
Life Master Pairs (2) 1996, 1997
Open Pairs I (1) 1997
European Championships (2)
Open Teams (2) 2001, 2014

Other notable 2nd places
Buffett Cup (1) 2006
World Mind Sports Games Individual (1) 2008
Cavendish Invitational Pairs (1) 2010

References

External links

The 1997 Le Bridgeur Best Play of the Year

1970 births
Norwegian contract bridge players
Monegasque contract bridge players
Bermuda Bowl players
Contract bridge writers
Norwegian emigrants to Monaco
People from Nord-Fron
Living people
Doping cases in sport
Sportspeople from Innlandet